Wonderbra (band) is an Indonesian independent band from Depok, West Java. The group was formed in 2005 and consists of Teraya Paramehta (vocals), Nosa Normanda (guitar), Asep Rachman Muchlas (Bass) and Yuda Wahyudin (guitar). They have released two albums: Crossing The Railroad (2007) and #fiksifriksi (2011).

Achievements

 2007: The single "Hell's Kitchen" from Crossing The Railroad reached no.1 in Ardan Radio Bandung. 
 2008: "Indie-V", a single
 2011: The band's second album, #fiksifriksi has been listed in top 10 album chart by Rolling Stone Indonesia, at which Wonderbra was ranked #7 in September 2011 and #10 in October 2011, sharing the list with other musicians in Indonesia, such as Raisa, Geisha, Gigi, Burgerkill, BRNDLS (The Brandals), and Marcel. Music writer/comedian Soleh Solihun reviewed #fiksifriksi as "A wonderful album."
 In the last eleven years, Wonderbra have performed in hundreds of gigs and several TV shows such as Radio Show in tvOne (Indonesia), and O Channel. Some of their local gigs are RCT UI Backstage in 2007, Indie Carnival HUT Serang, West Java, 2008 and Grassroot Showcase 2 in 2011. They have also performed in international events such as Jakarta Rock Parade 2009, Jakarta Blues Festival 2009, and Java Rockinland 2011.

Supporting social movements
They participate actively in social change events, and they appear in the BERSAMA Project, music video, a creative intervention for gender equality with the theme #1Voice4Women. In the project they performed alongside Tika and The Dissidents, Bonita & the husBAND, and singer Yacko in making video clips directed by Flo Hadjon. They speak up about climate change by performing in an event organized by OXFAM. And they also performed with Tika and The Dissidents in celebrating International Women's Day in Jakarta, with the theme "Tubuhku Otoritasku" (My Body My Authority).

Discography

Studio albums
 Crossing the Railroad (2007), LIMI Records
 #fiksifriksi (2011), Dagda Records

Mini albums
 Seven Awesome Years (2012), Self-released

Compilations
 Provoke! Magazine Compilation, Vol. 1. (2008), Provoke Magazine
 Kompilasi Kansas (2015), Akhirnya Direcord

References

External links
 

Indonesian rock music groups
Musical groups established in 2005
Blues musical groups